Sports Colleges are senior secondary schools which promote sports alongside secondary education.

United Kingdom
Sports Colleges were introduced in 1997 as part of the Specialist Schools Programme in the United Kingdom. The programme enabled secondary schools to specialise in certain fields, in this case, PE, sports and dance. Schools that successfully applied to the Specialist Schools Trust and became Sports Colleges received extra funding from this joint private sector and government scheme. Sports Colleges act as a local point of reference for other schools and businesses in the area, with an emphasis on promoting sports within the community.

The Specialist Schools Programme ended in 2011 after the change of government. Despite this, schools can still become Sports Colleges through the Dedicated Schools Grant or academisation.

India
The first Sports College was started in the Indian city of Lucknow in 1975. These are senior secondary schools affiliated with state board of examinations and run by state governments. At present, the state of Uttarakhand has two sports college and the state of Uttar Pradesh has three.

References 

Education in the United Kingdom
Physical education in India
1997 introductions

Specialist schools programme